Yetholm Loch is a loch near Kelso, in the Scottish Borders area of Scotland, in the former Roxburghshire.

There was a tower on an island in Yetholm Loch which could be reached via a causeway. The tower was destroyed by the Earl of Surrey on the night of 17 May 1523.

The loch lies in a crescent-shaped valley, at the edge of the Cheviot Hills. The southern end of the loch is swamp, but it gradually gives way to fen and willow scrub.

See also

List of Sites of Special Scientific Interest in Berwickshire and Roxburgh, SSSI
List of places in the Scottish Borders

References

External links
SSSI CITATION, 17 October 1983
RCAHMS record of Loch Tower, Yetholm Loch
Scottish Borders Council: Standing Open Water Habitat Action Plan
Scottish Environment Protection Agency: Catchment Pollution Reduction Programme under Directive 78/659.EEC
Geograph image: Yetholm Loch from Fourmartdean

Lochs of the Scottish Borders
Nature reserves in Scotland
Protected areas in the Scottish Borders
Sites of Special Scientific Interest in Berwickshire and Roxburgh
Freshwater lochs of Scotland